The Ponary massacre or the Paneriai massacre was the mass murder of up to 100,000 people, mostly Jews, Poles, and Russians, by German SD and SS and their Lithuanian collaborators, including Ypatingasis būrys killing squads, during World War II and the Holocaust in the Generalbezirk Litauen of Reichskommissariat Ostland. The murders took place between July 1941 and August 1944 near the railway station at Ponary (now Paneriai), a suburb of today's Vilnius, Lithuania. 70,000 Jews were murdered at Ponary, along with up to 20,000 Poles, and 8,000 Soviet POWs, most of them from nearby Vilna (Vilnius), and its newly formed Vilna Ghetto.

Lithuania became one of the first locations outside occupied Poland in World War II where the Nazis would mass murder Jews as part of the Final Solution. Out of 70,000 Jews living in Vilna according to Snyder, only about 7,000 survived the war. The number of dwellers, estimated by Sedlis, as of June 1941 was 80,000 Jews, or one-half of the city's population. According to the Holocaust Encyclopedia and others, more than two-thirds of them or at least 50,000 Jews had been killed before the end of 1941.

Background
Following the Żeligowski's Mutiny and the creation of the short-lived Central Lithuania, in accordance with international agreements ratified in 1923 by the League of Nations, the town of Ponary became part of the Wilno Voivodship (Kresy region) of the Second Polish Republic. The predominant languages in the area were Polish and Yiddish. After the Nazi-Soviet invasion of Poland in September 1939, the region was annexed by the Soviets and after about a month, on October 10, transferred to Lithuania according to the Soviet–Lithuanian Treaty.

Following the Soviet annexation of Lithuania and the Baltic states in June 1940, the construction of an oil storage facility began near Ponary in conjunction with the future Soviet military airfield. That project was never completed, and in June 1941 the area was overrun by the Wehrmacht in Operation Barbarossa. The Nazi killing squads decided to use the six large pits excavated for the oil storage tanks to abduct, murder, and to hide the bodies of condemned locals.

Massacres

The massacres began in July 1941, as soon as SS Einsatzkommando 9 arrived in Vilna on 2 July 1941. Most of the actual killings were carried out by the Special Platoons of Ypatingasis burys (Lithuanian volunteers) 80 men strong. On 9 August 1941, EK 9 was replaced by EK 3. In September, the Vilna Ghetto was established. In the same month 3,700 Jews were shot in one operation, and 6,000 in another, rounded up in the city and walked to Paneriai. Most victims were stripped before being shot. Further mass killings, aided by Ypatingasis burys, took place throughout the summer and fall.

By the end of the year, about 50,000–60,000 Vilna Jews—men, women, and children—had been killed according to the Holocaust Encyclopedia. According to Snyder 21,700 of them were shot at Ponary, but there are serious discrepancies in the death toll for this period. Yitzhak Arad supplied information in his book Ghetto in Flames based on original Jewish documentation augmented by the Einsatzgruppen reports, ration cards and work permits.

According to his estimates, until the end of December, 33,500 Jews of Vilna were murdered in Ponary, 3,500 fled east, and 20,000 remained in the ghetto. The reason for such a wide range of estimated deaths was the presence of war refugees arriving from German-occupied western Poland, whose residence rights were denied by the new Lithuanian administration. On the eve of the Soviet annexation of Lithuania in June 1940, Vilna was home to around 100,000 newcomers, including 85,000 Poles, and 10,000 Jews according to Lithuanian Red Cross.

The pace of killings slowed in 1942, as ghettoised Jewish slave-workers were appropriated by the Wehrmacht. As Soviet troops advanced in 1943, the Nazi units tried to cover up the crime under the Aktion 1005 directive. Eighty inmates from the Stutthof concentration camp were formed into Leichenkommando ("corpse units"). The workers were forced to dig up bodies, pile them on wood and burn them. The ashes were then ground up, mixed with sand and buried. After months of this gruesome work, the brigade managed to escape on 19 April 1944 through a tunnel dug with spoons. Eleven of the eighty who escaped survived the war; their testimony contributed to revealing the massacre.

Victims

The total number of victims by the end of 1944 was between 70,000 and 100,000. According to post-war exhumation by the forces of Soviet 2nd Belorussian Front the majority (50,000–70,000) of the victims were Polish and Lithuanian Jews from nearby Polish and Lithuanian cities, while the rest were primarily Poles (about 20,000) and Russians (about 8,000). According to Monika Tomkiewicz, author of a 2008 book on the Ponary massacre, 80,000 people were killed, including 72,000 Jews, 5,000 Soviet prisoners, between 1,500 and 2,000 Poles, 1,000 people described as Communists or Soviet activists, and 40 Romani people.

The Polish victims were mostly members of Polish intelligentsia—academics, educators (such as Kazimierz Pelczar, a professor of Stefan Batory University), priests (such as Father Romuald Świrkowski), and members of the Armia Krajowa resistance movement. Among the first victims were approximately 7,500 Soviet POWs shot in 1941 soon after Operation Barbarossa begun. At later stages there were also smaller numbers of victims of other nationalities, including local Russians, Romani and Lithuanians, particularly Communist sympathizers (Liudas Adomauskas, Valerijonas Knyva, Andrius ir Aleksandra Bulotos) and over 80 soldiers of General Povilas Plechavičius' Local Lithuanian Detachment who refused to follow German orders.

Commemoration
Information about the massacre began to spread as early as 1943, due to the activities and works of Helena Pasierbska, Józef Mackiewicz, Kazimierz Sakowicz and others. Nonetheless the Soviet regime, which supported the resettlement of Poles from the Kresy, found it convenient to deny that Poles or Jews were singled out for massacre in Paneriai; the official line was that Paneriai was a site of massacre of Soviet citizens only. This led some—including Polish Prime Minister Jerzy Buzek—to compare this to the Katyn massacre.

On 22 October 2000, a decade after the fall of communism, in independent Lithuania, an effort by several Polish organizations resulted in raising a monument (a cross) to fallen Polish citizens, during an official ceremony in which representatives of both Polish and Lithuanian governments (Bronisław Komorowski, Polish Minister of Defence, and his Lithuanian counterpart), as well as several NGOs, took place.

The site of the massacre is commemorated by a monument to the victims of the Holocaust (erected in 1991), a memorial to the Polish victims (erected in 1990, reconstructed in 2000), monument to soldiers of Lithuanian Local Squad killed by Nazis in May, 1944 (erected in 2004), memorial stone to Soviet war prisoners, starved to death and shot here in 1941 (erected in 1996) and a small museum (currently Paneriai memorial information center). The first monument in the former mass murder site was built by Vilnius Jews in 1948 but was soon replaced by Soviet regime with conventional obelisk dedicated to "Victims of Fascism".

The murders at Paneriai are currently being investigated by the Gdańsk branch of the Polish Institute of National Remembrance and by the Genocide and Resistance Research Center of Lithuania. The basic facts about memorial signs in the Paneriai memorial and the objects of the former mass murder site  (killing pits, tranches, gates, paths, etc.) are now presented in the webpage created by the Vilna Gaon State Jewish Museum.

The massacre was recorded by Polish journalist Kazimierz Sakowicz (1899-1944) in a series of journal entries in hiding from his farm house in Wilno, Lithuania. After Sakowicz's passing in 1944, the collection of entries were located and found on various scrap pieces of paper, soda bottles and a calendar from 1941 by holocaust-survivor and author Rahel Margolis. Margolis, who had lost family members during the Ponary Massacre, later published the collection in 1999 in Polish. The diary became widely important to tracing the timeline of the massacre, and in many instances gave closure to surviving family members on what happened to their loved ones. Written in detail, the diary is a form of testimonial writing from a first-person witness account of the atrocities.

Memorial at the site

See also
List of massacres in Lithuania
Lithuanian collaboration with Nazi Germany
History of Vilnius

References

Footnotes

Citations

Further reading

External links
  Vilna During the Holocaust; Yad Vashem.
 
 US Holocaust Museum article on death of Vilna's Jews; Holocaust Encyclopedia, United States Holocaust Memorial Museum.
 Vilna: 1941-1943; RTR Foundation.
 Ponary - The Vilna Killing Site: Prototype for the Permanent Death Camps in Poland, Holocaust Education & Archive Research Team.
 Neglecting the Lithuanian Holocaust, Timothy Snyder, The New York Review, July 25, 2011.
 
 The crime in Ponary 1941–1944; Institute Of National Remembrance

Film and images
 .
 Chronicles of the Vilna Ghetto: wartime photographs & documents; vilnaghetto.com
 

1941 in Lithuania
1942 in Lithuania
1943 in Lithuania
1944 in Lithuania
Anti-Polish sentiment in Europe
Einsatzgruppen
Germany–Poland relations
History of Vilnius
Holocaust massacres and pogroms in Lithuania
Jewish Lithuanian history
Jewish Polish history
Lithuania–Poland relations
Lithuanian collaboration with Nazi Germany
Massacres in 1941
Massacres in 1942
Massacres in 1943
Massacres in 1944
Paneriai
World War II crimes in Poland
World War II massacres